Dudești is a neighbourhood in Sector 3 of Bucharest. It is located in the south-eastern part of the city, along Calea Dudești. Nearby neighbourhoods include Vitan, Văcărești, and Dristor. 

The neolithic Dudești culture (5th-4th millennium BC), which encompassed most of the Wallachian Plain and Dobruja, gets its name from this region of Bucharest, as this was the first place where its archeological remains were found.

Originally a village, it was included in Bucharest as it expanded. Its name is related to the Wallachian aristocratic family of the Dudești, with an etymology leading back to the Romanian dud, "mulberry tree" and the suffix -ești. During the first reign of Alexander Mourousis as Prince of Wallachia, in the context of a bubonic plague outbreak, it became the site of a quarantined hospital for the afflicted.

Unlike other nearby areas, most of the neighbourhood escaped Nicolae Ceaușescu's plans of demolition, though parts of it were demolished to make room for some construction projects. A big tram depot and the Bucharest Mall are located nearby.

Districts of Bucharest